Lanhe  (榄核镇) is a town in Nansha District, in the municipal region of Guangzhou, Guangdong,  China.

References

Panyu District
Township-level divisions of Guangdong